Paralepetopsis clementensis is a species of sea snail, a true limpet, a marine gastropod mollusk in the family Neolepetopsidae, one of the families of true limpets.

Description

Distribution
northeastern Pacific Ocean

Habitat 
whale bone

References

External links

Neolepetopsidae
Gastropods described in 2008